Roland Anthony Oliver FBA (30 March 1923 – 9 February 2014) was an Indian-born English academic and Emeritus Professor of African history at the University of London. 

Throughout a long career he was an eminent researcher, writer, teacher, administrator and organiser, who had a profound effect on the development of African Studies in the United Kingdom.

Biography 

Oliver was born in Srinagar, Kashmir, India in 1923.

Following his undergraduate and doctoral studies at the University of Cambridge between 1941 and 1948, Roland Oliver joined the staff of the School of Oriental and African Studies (SOAS) at the University of London, where he was successively Lecturer, Reader and Professor until his retirement in 1986. His appointment as a Lecturer in African history marked the beginnings of the contemporary academic field of African history. The African History Seminar that he founded and chaired at the School of Oriental and African Studies (SOAS) became the most important venue for the advancement of the academic discipline of African history anywhere in the world, and has profoundly influenced all subsequent scholarship on the subject.

He travelled extensively throughout Africa in 1949-50 and 1957-58 and visited the continent almost every year since then. In 1953, 1957 and 1961 he organised international conferences on African history and archaeology, which did much to establish the subject as an academic discipline.

He was a founding editor, with John Fage, in 1960 of the Journal of African History and, again with John Fage, in 1960 of the Cambridge History of Africa which appeared in eight volumes between 1975 and 1986.

In 1963, he carried out a survey of 250 working Africanist academics in the United Kingdom and founded the African Studies Association of the UK (ASAUK) itself. He became its fourth President in 1966-67.

Oliver was Visiting Professor at the University of Brussels (1961), Northwestern University (1962), and Harvard University (1967). From 1979 to 1993 he was president of the British Institute in Eastern Africa.

The Cambridge History of Africa, and his influential Oxford History of East Africa, were produced in a decade between the late 1970s and late 1980s. These histories recognised and celebrated the long, rich history of Africa, which for the first half of the 20th century was previously thought by historians to have only a history "created" by white travellers, administrators and settlers. 

In 2004, Oliver was awarded the Distinguished Africanist Award of the African Studies Association of the UK (ASAUK) and in 1993 he was elected a Fellow of the British Academy.

He died on 9 February 2014 at the age of 90 in Frilsham, Berkshire, England.

Books 
The Missionary Factor in East Africa, 1952.
Sir Harry Johnston and the Scramble for Africa, 1957.
A Short History of Africa (with John Fage), 1962, 6th edition 1988.
Africa since 1800 (with Anthony Atmore) 1967.
Africa in the Iron Age (with Brian Fagan) 1975.
The African Middle Ages (with Anthony Atmore) 1981.
The African Experience: From Olduvai Gorge to the 21st Century, 1991, Revised 1999.
In the Realms of Gold: Pioneering in African History, 1997.

References

External links
http://asauk.net/awards/africanist.shtml
http://www.perseusbooksgroup.com/Westview/author_detail.jsp?id=287392
http://www.africana.co.uk/collections/col_oliv.shtml

1923 births
2014 deaths
Historians of Africa
English Africanists
Indian Africanists
Academics of SOAS University of London
Fellows of the British Academy
Northwestern University faculty
Harvard University staff
British expatriates in the United States
Presidents of the African Studies Association of the United Kingdom